Greater Tampa Bay Area Council serves Scouts in West-Central Florida with the council headquarters in Tampa, Florida. Youth are served in the following nine counties: Citrus, Hardee, Hernando, Highlands, Hillsborough, Pasco, Pinellas, Polk and Sumter.
Greater Tampa Bay Area Council was formed on May 1, 2016 by the merger of Gulf Ridge Council with West Central Florida Council.

Organization
The council is split into eight districts:

 Ft Brooke District serving northern half of Hillsborough County
 Lake Region District serving Hardee County, Highlands County, and the eastern half of Polk County
 Miccosukee District serving Northern Pinellas County (from 54th Avenue North up to the Pinellas/Pasco county line)
 Skyway District serving St. Petersburg (south of 54th Avenue North)
 Suncoast District serving Pasco County (including Trinity, New Port Richey, Land O’Lakes, Dade City, Zephyrhills, and Wesley Chapel)
 Thunderbird District serving Western half of Polk County
 Timucua District serving Southern half of Hillsborough County
 Withlacoochee District serving Citrus, Hernando and Sumter counties

Camps

Flaming Arrow Scout Reservation

Flaming Arrow Scout Reservation (FASR) is a 677 acre Boy Scout Camp located in the pine flatwoods outside of Lake Wales, Florida, on the shores of three spring fed lakes.

Sand Hill Scout Reservation

Sand Hill Scout Reservation belongs to the Cub Scouts, Boy Scouts, Varsity Scouts, and Venturers of the Greater Tampa Bay Area Council and is intended for their instruction and enjoyment.

Camp Soule

Camp Soule serves the Scouting Community in the West Central Florida area. It offers protected trees, wildlife, and beauty centered in the most populous county of Florida. Camp Soule offers four improved campsites (with Adirondack shelters, latrines, and showers), six primitive campsites, a dining hall, trading post, large activity fields, Olympic-size swimming pool, pool house, BB gun range, Cub Scout and Boy Scout archery ranges, two cabins, Council campfire ring, chapel, and a full time ranger on property.

Camp Bigfoot
Bigfoot Wilderness Camp (BWC) is a hidden gem at Green Swamp, east of Dade City, Florida. It is located within a  wildlife preserve owned by the State of Florida - Southwest Florida Water Management District. The facility includes a  cabin with electricity and indoor plumbing on the banks of the Withlacoochee River, two small box stoves for heating, showers both indoor and outdoor, a campfire area, an outhouse latrine and four adjacent primitive patrol campsites.

Camp Owen J Brorein

Centrally located in the Hillsborough County community of Odessa, Camp Brorein is the Council’s oldest camping facility. Located in Odessa Florida, this camp has been dedicated to the advancement of Scouting from its founding in 1923.

Camp Alafia
Camp Alafia is a primitive camp near Lithia and east of Tampa in Hillsborough County. The property is bounded to the west by the Alafia River and contains several campsites beneath an oak canopy.

Order of the Arrow

Uh-To-Yeh-Hut-Tee Lodge

Uh-To-Yeh-Hut-Tee Lodge #89 is the Greater Tampa Bay Area Council's Order of the Arrow lodge, one of eight in Section E-5 covering the state of Florida (except the Panhandle).

Uh-To-Yeh-Hut-Tee Lodge 89 was formed in 2016 with the merger of Seminole Lodge 85 and Timuquan Lodge 340.  The merger was effective during the weekend of August 5 – 7, 2016.  The transition team chose the name, which means lighting, and the totem, which is the Bull. Uh-To-Yeh-Hut-Tee Lodge has been serving the Greater Tampa Bay Area Council and local communities since 2016.

The lodge is organized into six chapters corresponding to the Council's districts:

Suncoast District - Abiaca Chapter
Skyway District - Calusa Chapter
Fort Brooke District - Netopalis Tachquiwi Chapter
Miccosukee District - Osceola Chapter
Timucua, Thunderbird and Lake Region Districts - Pèthakhuwe Chapter
Withlacoochee District - Withlacoochee Chapter

Pre-Merger OA Lodges
Seminole Lodge
Seminole Lodge was an Order of the Arrow lodge associated with the Gulf Ridge Council, located in West-Central Florida.

Chartered in 1936 while under the name Kiondashama, the lodge name was changed to Seminole by September, 1938. Seminole is the name of a Native American people whose original homelands included portions of Florida.

In 1951 Seminole Lodge lost its charter, but just one year later they were once again active. Seminole was the oldest lodge in the section and at the time of the merger was celebrating its 80th Anniversary. The lodge has had one member serve as national chief in 2003, Nick Digirolamo. 

Timuquan Lodge
The West Central Florida Council's Order of the Arrow Lodge was Timuquan Lodge 340, founded in 1946 and was named in honor of the extinct Timucua Native American tribe of northern and central Florida. 

The first Brotherhood members of Timuquan Lodge were Selwyn Fuller, Joe Reed, Roger W Irving and Charles Martin.

At the time of the merger Timuquan Lodge was celebrating its 70th anniversary.

See also
 Scouting in Florida

References

Local councils of the Boy Scouts of America
Southern Region (Boy Scouts of America)
Youth organizations based in Florida
2016 establishments in Florida